Giorgio Salmoiraghi (26 November 1936 – 27 December 2022) was an Italian painter. He was born in Milan.

Salmoiraghi graduated from the artistic High school of Brera Academy in 1955. In 1960 he was among the founders of the “Renewal of the Classical Values” together with Valmore Grazioli and Gabriele Mandel. As of 2011 he was the Editor of "Homonym Magazine" and he participated with the renovators in shows and lectures held by the movement.

In 1962, he was active in the syndical sector and he belonged to the U.S.A.I.B.A. - U.I.L. of Lombardy and he participated in and organized the first regional show at the "Museo della Scienza e della Tecnica" in Milan. He organized other arts shows, including the 1964 and 1966 shows of contemporary art at "Royal Palace of Milan" and a 1969 show of contemporary art at "Royal Villa of Milan".

Salmoiraghi has participated in and organized different biennial exhibitions in Milan and numerous syndical shows. Salmoiraghi has been co-manager of the art magazine “Poliacos” with Valmore Grazioli and Rosalva Altini.

Salmoiraghi held personal shows, including in 1976 at the "Museo di Milano" organized by the Municipality of Milan.

In 1979 he edited a monograph from the Bank Union of Credit (BUC) of Lugano, copies of which are held in public and private libraries including the Pompidou Center in Paris.

From 1982 to 1984 he created a   trittico for the church of Chiesa di San Giacinto (Brescia). In 1984 the advertising of the “Barilla”, an Italian weekly magazine, hinged on Salmoiraghi. In 1986-87 he worked in the Vatican to create the portrait of John Paul II exhibited in Palace of Saint Callixtus.

In 1990 he received the "Ambrogino d'oro" from the Municipality of Milan. In 1993 he organized a personal show at "Accademia Scalabrino" in Montecatini. In 1994 the book cooperative I.U.L.M. s.c.r.l edited Gabriele Mandel's monograph “Il magico e il sacro nell’arte di Giorgio Salmoiraghi”.

His works are exhibited in public and private galleries. He belonged to the Accademia Tiberina and to the Accademia dei 500.

Salmoiraghi died on 27 December 2022, at the age of 86.

References

Related Items 
 painter Max Doerner biography
 painter Federico Von Rieger biography
 Church San Giacinto BS
 Palace of Saint Callixtus

External links 
 Official Site
 Artmajeur
 Saatchi Gallery
 Artslant

1936 births
2022 deaths
20th-century Italian male artists
20th-century Italian painters
Italian male painters
Painters from Milan